Kings' monitor (Varanus kingorum), also known commonly as Kings' goanna, Kings' rock monitor and pygmy rock monitor, is a small species of monitor lizard in the family Varanidae. The species is native to Australia.

Geographic range
Varanus kingorum is endemic to the northwestern part of the Northern Territory, and the northeastern part of Western Australia.

Taxonomy
The species description was published in 1980, the result of a revision of Western and Central Australian varanid taxa.

Kings' monitor belongs to the subgenus Odatria along with the peacock monitor and the Pilbara monitor. Comparatively little is known about this species.

The holotype was collected beneath rocks in 1978 at Timber Creek in the Northern Territory by Max King. The specific name, kingorum (genitive plural), is in honor of Canadian-born Australian ecologist Richard Dennis King (1942–2002) and Australian geneticist Max King (born 1946), honouring their contributions to the understanding of Australia varanids.

Habitat
Kings' goanna inhabits rocky outcrops of the Kimberley region and adjacent areas. It is usually found in areas with rock exfoliations or slopes with open bushland and shrubs, where boulders and outcrops provide its required microhabitat. V. kingorum is also found in grasslands.

Description
It is reddish brown in colour with a black reticulum in the juvenile that breaks down with age to form dark flecks. Small blackish spots appear at most parts of the dark upper body, and at the throat and near the vent against the creamy colour of the underparts.

Behaviour
Kings' monitor retreats into holes, rock fissures, and small crevices when it is approached, being extremely shy.

This species has a long tail that is sometimes used to prod prey out of tight, inaccessible crevices. Such is a behaviour demonstrated by both adults and hatchlings alike, and as such is likely instinctual rather than learned.

Reproduction 
Incubation period of eggs ranges from 89 to 126 days at a temperature of 29 +/- 2 °C.

Diet
Varanus kingorum appear to feed exclusively on insects, including locusts, termites, and insect eggs.

References

External links
Photo of Varanus kingorum at Varanus.nl
"Varanus kingorum ". The Reptile Database. www.reptile-database.org. (Retrieved 11 May. 2010).
Reptileforums.co.uk

Further reading
Bennet DF (2003). "Australische Warane ". Reptilia (Münster) 8 (5): 18–25. (in German).
Bennet DF (2003). "Australian Monitors". Reptilia (GB) (30): 12–19.
Cogger HG (2000). Reptiles and Amphibians of Australia, Sixth Edition. Sanibel Island, Florida: Ralph Curtis Publishing. 808 pp.
De Lisle HF (1996). Natural History of Monitor Lizards. Malabar, Florida: Krieger.
Eidenmüller B (2003). "Haltung und kontinuierliche Vermehrung von Kings Felsenwaran, Varanus kingorum STORR 1980, mit der erstmaligen Nachzucht eines albinotischen Jungtieres ". Reptilia (Münster) 8 (5): 36–40. (in German).
Eidenmüller B (1999)."Haltung und Nachzucht von Kings Felsenwaran, Varanus kingorum STORR 1980 ". Herpetofauna 21 (121): 19–23. (in German).
Eidenmüller B (2001). "Between the rocks – Pick up tips on breeding and keeping King’s rock monitors (Varanus kingorum)". Reptiles 9 (5): 78–81.
Eidenmüller B (2007). "Small monitors in the terrarium". Reptilia (GB) (50): 12–19.
Horn HG (1977). "Notizen zur Systematik, Fundortangaben und Haltung von Varanus (Varanus) karlschmidti". Salamandra 13 (2): 78–88. (in German).
Storr GM (1980). "The monitor lizards (genus Varanus Merrem, 1820) of Western Australia". Records of the Western Australian Museum 8 (2): 237–293.

Varanus
Monitor lizards of Australia
Reptiles described in 1980
Taxa named by Glen Milton Storr